The 1884–85 United States Senate elections were held on various dates in various states, coinciding with the presidential election of 1884. As these U.S. Senate elections were prior to the ratification of the Seventeenth Amendment in 1913, senators were chosen by state legislatures. Senators were elected over a wide range of time throughout 1884 and 1885, and a seat may have been filled months late or remained vacant due to legislative deadlock. In these elections, terms were up for the senators in Class 3.

With three state legislatures failing to elect their senators in time, both Republicans and Democrats lost seats. Republicans, nevertheless, retained majority control and the Readjusters joined their caucus. By the beginning of the first session, in December 1885, Republicans had won all three vacant seats, increasing their majority.

Results summary 
Senate party division, 49th Congress (1885–1887)

 Majority party: Republican (42)
 Minority party: Democratic (34)
 Other parties: (0)
 Total seats: 76

Change in Senate composition

Before the elections

After the elections

Beginning of the first session, December 7, 1885

Race summaries

Special elections during the 48th Congress 
In this election, the winner was seated in 1885 before March 4.

Races leading to the 49th Congress 

In these regular elections, the winners were elected for the term beginning March 4, 1885; ordered by state.

All of the elections involved the Class 3 seats.

Elections during the 49th Congress 
In these elections, the winners were elected in 1885 after March 4, sorted by election date.

Complete list of races

Maryland 

Ephraim King Wilson II was elected by an unknown margin of votes, for the Class 3 seat.

New York 

The New York election was held January 20, 1885, by the New York State Legislature.

Republican Elbridge G. Lapham had been elected to this seat in a special election in 1881 to succeed Roscoe Conkling who had resigned. Lapham's term would expire on March 3, 1885.

At the State election in November 1883, 19 Republicans and 13 Democrats were elected for a two-year term (1884-1885) in the State Senate. At the State election in November 1884, 73 Republicans and 55 Democrats were elected for the session of 1885 to the Assembly. The 108th New York State Legislature met from January 6 to May 22, 1885, at Albany, New York.

The caucus of Republican State legislators met on January 19, President pro tempore of the State Senate Dennis McCarthy presided. 19 State senators and 73 assemblymen attended. The Evarts faction required the nomination to be made by viva voce vote, which was opposed by the Morton faction, but was carried by a vote of 64 to 28. The caucus nominated Ex-U.S. Secretary of State William M. Evarts on the first ballot.

The Democratic caucus nominated Ex-Mayor of New York Edward Cooper.

William M. Evarts was the choice of both the Assembly and the State Senate, and was declared elected.

Note: The votes were cast on January 20, but both Houses met in a joint session on January 21 to compare nominations, and declare the result.

Ohio 

In 1884, the Democrats held a majority in the Ohio legislature. In a caucus meeting to determine the party's choice for United States Senator, many Democratic legislators looked to replace the incumbent Senator, Democrat George H. Pendleton, because they disagreed with his advocacy of civil service reform and low tariffs. Some of Pendleton's opponents, led by Oliver Payne, promoted Henry B. Payne for the Senate seat, recalling his opposition to both of those positions during his time in the House. After a secret ballot by the Democratic caucus, Henry B. Payne received 46 out of 80 votes. Because Oliver was a trustee and treasurer of the Standard Oil company, many of the Pendleton supporters immediately alleged that $100,000 from the oil trust had been used to bribe Democratic legislators, and claimed that an open ballot would not have favored Payne.

When the full legislature met, Henry B. Payne was elected with 78 votes out of 120. The Democratic legislature initially refused to investigate their members' alleged corruption, but when Republicans regained the majority in the next session, the legislature looked into the allegations and forwarded the results to the federal Senate. The evidence gathered was voluminous, but the Senate declined to expel Payne, who proclaimed his innocence. While there was never enough evidence for definitive proof of bribery, biographer Dewayne Burke wrote that the "circumstantial evidence seems to convict Payne" of the charge.

Pennsylvania 

The Pennsylvania election was held January 20, 1885. 
The Pennsylvania General Assembly convened January 20, 1885. Incumbent Republican J. Donald Cameron, who was elected in an 1877 special election and re-elected in 1879, was a successful candidate for re-election to another term. The results of the vote of both houses combined are as follows:

|-
|-bgcolor="#EEEEEE"
| colspan="3" align="right" | Totals
| align="right" | 251
| align="right" | 100.00%
|}

See also 
 1884 United States elections
 1884 United States presidential election
 1884 United States House of Representatives elections
 48th United States Congress
 49th United States Congress

Notes

References

Further reading 
 Party Division in the Senate, 1789-Present, via Senate.gov